Alfred Banbrook (21 December 1886 – 12 January 1950) was a British wrestler. He competed in the men's Greco-Roman light heavyweight at the 1908 Summer Olympics.

References

1886 births
1950 deaths
British male sport wrestlers
Olympic wrestlers of Great Britain
Wrestlers at the 1908 Summer Olympics
Place of birth missing